Harleton High School is a public high school located in Harleton, Texas USA. It is part of the Harleton Independent School District which is located in northwestern Harrison County and classified as a 2A school by the UIL. In 2015, the school was rated "Met Standard" by the Texas Education Agency.

Athletics
The Harleton Wildcats compete in the following sports - 

Baseball
Basketball
Cross Country
Football
Golf
Softball
Tennis
Track and Field

State Finalists

Baseball - 
2005(1A), 2015(2A)
Softball -  
2014(1A), 2015(2A), 2016(2A)

Notable alumni
Keyou Craver, former professional football player

References

External links
Harleton ISD

Schools in Harrison County, Texas
Public high schools in Texas